La fiera may refer to: 

La fiera (Mexican TV series), 1983 Mexican telenovela 
La fiera (Venezuelan TV series), 1978 Venezuelan telenovela
La Fiera, Mexican wrestler (1961–2010)
La Fiera FC, American indoor soccer team based in Hidalgo, Texas